Wi Seong-gon (born 20 January 1968) is a South Korean politician who is member of the National Assembly.

Early life and career 
Wi Seong-gon was born on 20 January 1968 in Jangheung County, South Jeolla Province. When he was 8 years old, he moved to Seogwipo, Jeju Province with his parents. He graduated from Jeju National University.

Political career 
Wi served as a member of the Jeju Provincial Council from 2006 to 2015.

In 2016, he was nominated by the Democratic Party in the legislative election and was elected in Seogwipo, Jeju Province.

References 

1968 births
Living people
People from South Jeolla Province
Members of the National Assembly (South Korea)
Minjoo Party of Korea politicians
South Korean Roman Catholics